HT Omega is an audio hardware manufacturing company based in Ontario, California.  It designs and builds multimedia hardware and peripherals for personal computer and professional markets.  HT Omega has a dedicated research & development division, creating equipment based on Dolby Digital and DTS technologies, marketed towards gamers and home entertainment enthusiasts.

Product line 

HT Omega was one of the first companies to offer true 24-bit (192 kHz) performance in its sound cards, by implementing the C-Media Oxygen 8788 digital signal processor.  Some cards have swappable op-amps.

HT Omega's line of PC audio cards includes the following:

 STRIKER 7.1 (Conventional PCI)
 CLARO, CLARO plus + (PCI)
 eCLARO (PCI Express)
 CLARO halo, halo XT (PCI)
 Fenix (PCI Express)

References

External links 
www.htomega.com: HT Omega company website.  Retrieved 17 December 2011.

Audio equipment manufacturers of the United States
Manufacturing companies based in California